Lookout (1890 in Kentucky – after 1898) was an American Thoroughbred racehorse that is best known for winning the 1893 Kentucky Derby.

Lookout was a chestnut colt with full (up to the knee and hock joints) white stockings on three of his legs. His sire, Troubadour, was the 1886 Suburban Handicap winner, while his damsire, King Alfonso, was a successful flat-racer and sire.

Kentucky Derby
The nineteenth Derby was run on a sunny, clear day with a field of six horses. A crowd of 10,000 spectators looked on in one of the biggest turnouts since the race's founding in 1875. J. Cushing and J. Orth had entered two of their horses, with the other being the notoriously difficult Boundless. Lookout was ridden by Edward Kunze, and Boundless had R. Williams as his jockey. Lookout was the leader throughout the race, being continually pulled back by Kunze, and won by 5 lengths.[3] Plutus, Boundless, and Buck McCann (son of 1884 winner Buchanan) finished second, third, and fourth.

Later career
Lookout was gelded and was sold to Canadian Joseph E. Seagram, founder of the Seagram Distillery and a major Thoroughbred owner/breeder. The last record of him racing was in a September 1896 race where he finished last. By 1897, he was gelded and racing for J.R. Walker. He was sold in Toronto in November 1898 to L. Reinhardt, Jr. for $65.

Pedigree

References

1890 racehorse births
Racehorses trained in the United Kingdom
Racehorses bred in Kentucky
Kentucky Derby winners
Thoroughbred family A13